Kumba can refer to:

 Kumba is a city in Southwest Province, Cameroon
 Kumba (fish) is a genus of fishes in the family Macrouridae
 Kumba Ialá (also spelled Yala) (born in 1953) is a Guinea-Bissau politician and former President.
 Kumba (roller coaster), roller coaster at Busch Gardens Tampa
 Kumba Resources, South African iron ore company
 Kumba (Swedish rapper), a Swedish rap artist

See also